Penalves is a neighbourhood of the Portuguese city of Póvoa de Varzim.

Penalves was formerly known as Penalva or before it as Penalva de Regufe. Penalva is of Celtic roots: pen from penha (stone) with alva (white), thus white stone. In the 17th century, the Penalves variant became common.

Penalves is located in the south part of Matriz/Mariadeira district.

Neighbourhoods of Póvoa de Varzim